Western Orissa Development Council (WODC) is an administrative set-up established by the government of Orissa on 11 November 1998. This council was particularly established to bring development in the backward western Orissa region. This organization is highly criticized by politicians, and members of the civil society as it has failed to live up to the expectations. Many says that formation of the Western Orissa Development Council is an acknowledgement of regional imbalance, and term it as "rehabilitation platform" for the ruling party. The Orissa State Legislative Assembly demanding removal of the chairperson of the Western Orissa Development Council (WODC) and its expert members.

References

External links
 Koshal Discussion and Development Forum
 Voice of Western Orissa

State agencies of Odisha
Sambalpur
1998 establishments in Orissa
Government agencies established in 1998